Asb-e Marz is a village in the Central District of Sareyn County, Ardabil Province, Iran. At the 2006 census, its population was 492 in 119 families.

References 

Towns and villages in Sareyn County